Billy Haddleton (born William John Frederick Haddleton March 20, 1926 - August 10, 1990)  was a Canadian football player who played for the Toronto Argonauts. He won the Grey Cup with them in 1947.

References

1926 births
1990 deaths
Toronto Argonauts players
Canadian football quarterbacks
Canadian football running backs